Bolsover Cundy House is a recently restored 17th century conduit house that was used to supply water to the nearby Bolsover Castle. It is located near Houfton Road in Bolsover.

In the middle of the building is the brick water tank, which still collects water. It was built in the early 17th century and supplied water to the cistern house of Bolsover Castle until the 1920s. The roof is a solid stone vault to make it secure and impervious to decay, unlike timber.

A scheme to restore the conduit house was carried out in 2002-03 as part of a joint initiative between English Heritage, Bolsover Civic Society, and the local town and district councils. The aims of the project were to preserve the building, remove a safety hazard, and to raise the profile of this historic structure.

Bolsover Cundy House is in the care of English Heritage and managed by Bolsover Civic Society.

Notes

External links
Bolsover Cundy House at English Heritage

English Heritage sites in Derbyshire
Bolsover